Kuala Kedah Highway, Federal Route 78, is a major highway in Kedah, Malaysia. It is also a main route to Langkawi Island via Kuala Kedah.

Route background
The Kilometre Zero of the Federal Route 78 starts at Kuala Kedah.

Features
At most sections, the Federal Route 78 was built under the JKR R5 road standard, allowing maximum speed limit of up to 90 km/h.

List of junctions and towns

References

Highways in Malaysia
078